Frants Nielsen (22 January 1874 – 6 June 1961) was a Danish sports shooter who competed in the 1912 Summer Olympics. He was born in Alum, Purhus Municipality, and died in Randers.

In 1912 at the Stockholm Games he participated in the following events:

 50 metre team small-bore rifle – fifth place
 50 metre rifle, prone – 26th place
 50 metre pistol – 40th place
 300 metre free rifle, three positions – 46th place

References

1874 births
1961 deaths
Danish male sport shooters
ISSF rifle shooters
ISSF pistol shooters
Shooters at the 1912 Summer Olympics
Olympic shooters of Denmark
People from Randers Municipality
Sportspeople from the Central Denmark Region